Integrin beta-1-binding protein 1 is a protein that in humans is encoded by the ITGB1BP1 gene.

The cytoplasmic domains of integrins are essential for cell adhesion. The protein encoded by this gene binds to the beta1 integrin cytoplasmic domain. The interaction between this protein and beta1 integrin is highly specific. Two isoforms of this protein are derived from alternatively spliced transcripts. The shorter form of this protein does not interact with the beta1 integrin cytoplasmic domain. The longer form is a phosphoprotein and the extent of its phosphorylation is regulated by the cell-matrix interaction, suggesting an important role of this protein during integrin-dependent cell adhesion.

Interactions
ITGB1BP1 has been shown to interact with KRIT1, LRP2, CD29 and LRP1.

References

Further reading